The Zhuoshui Fengyu Bridge (simplified Chinese: 濯水风雨廊桥, pinyin: Zhuóshuǐ Fēngyǔ Lángqiáo) is a covered bridge in Qianjiang District of Chongqing, China. A bridge was first built at this spot in 1591 during the Ming dynasty. It has been destroyed several times over the centuries, in 1999 the bridge was rebuilt. On 28 November 2013, the bridge caught fire and was destroyed. In July 2017, the bridge was reopened after being rebuilt.

References
 

Chinese architectural history
Bridges in Chongqing
Covered bridges in China
Tourist attractions in Chongqing